The Creeps is a 1997 American comedy horror film, written by Benjamin Carr and directed by Charles Band.

Synopsis

Anna Quarrels works in the Rare Books Room of a library and is approached by Mr. Jamison from the University of Chicago, who wishes to study Mary Shelley's original manuscript for Frankenstein. After he finishes reading, Anna is about to return the manuscript to the stacks when she discovers that Jamison has switched blank paper for the manuscript. He walked out of the library with the real manuscript. Investigating, she learns that he used a fake I.D. to access the Rare Books Room.

Anna hires a private detective, David Raleigh, to track Jamison down. David finds fingerprints on the sign-in sheet and discovers that the man claiming to be Jamison is really Dr. Winston Berber, an unscrupulous scholar with doctorates in Physics, Mathematics, Folklore, and Philosophy. Berber is meanwhile gloating over his collection of rare manuscripts; along with the Shelley manuscript, he has obtained the originals of Guy Endore's The Werewolf of Paris (1933) and James Putnam's Mummy (1993). He now seeks the first edition of Bram Stoker's Dracula (1897) to complete his collection. Berber has invented an "Archetype Inducer" and plans to use the manuscripts to bring the four greatest monsters from horror history to life to do his bidding.

David has been so busy at the video store he runs that he has not yet located Berber. Berber eventually returns to the library, looking for the first edition of Dracula. Anna recognizes him, holds him at bay with a pair of scissors, phones David, and tells him to hurry over. Before David can arrive, Berber zaps Anna with a taser. He then steals the "Dracula" manuscript and takes both the book and Anna to his laboratory.

Anna regains consciousness and finds herself handcuffed to a table. Berber informs her that she is just what he needs: a virgin between the ages of 20 and 35 to be sacrificed naked in order to make the Archetype Inducer work. David breaks into the lab, having found Berber's address with an internet search. He overcomes Berber and releases Anna. She grabs the manuscripts, and the two hurriedly leave the lab. Unfortunately, Berber had already turned on the Archetype Inducer.

While David and Anna are making their escape, the four monsters step out of the machine. But strangely, The Mummy (Joe Smith), Frankenstein's monster, The Wolfman, and Dracula are all midgets. Berber assures him that he and the other monsters can be increased in stature, if he can recapture Anna. The monsters offer to get her for him.

Anna is not too happy either about the $6,200 invoice presented by David for his services. Anna's supervisor, Miss Christina, is herself unhappy, because she is a lesbian and Anna keeps dodging her romantic advances. When her advances are again dodged, Christina stays late at the library in order to make love to the first edition of Jane Eyre in the Rare Book Reading Room. She hears a noise out on the floor and falls prey to Dracula's net. Back at the lab, Berber is unhappy because Christina was not Anna and insists that he needs Anna. Dracula forces him to try the procedure anyway, and when it does not work, the antagonists set out again to find Anna.

At David's house, Dracula is unable to get Anna's address from David and tries to bite his neck. David exposes his crucifix and races out the door. Assuming he will lead them to Anna, the monsters and Berber follow as David leads them to the library. When the monsters attempt to capture Anna, David grabs Berber and takes him hostage. He threatens to break his neck if they refuse to leave Anna alone. David pulls out Berber's taser to threaten Dracula, who simply zaps it and causes it to explode.

Anna and David are taken back to the lab, and Berber prepares for the procedure. Dracula asks for assurance that it will work this time, but Berber won't guarantee it. He has found out that Anna is not a virgin. Dracula suggests that they should find another virgin in order to go through the procedure, but Berber says that will unbalance things. The only way to keep everything balanced is to find a virgin male. After asking, Dracula is assured that David is indeed a virgin.

The preparations for the human sacrifice continue while David tries to develop an idea. But at the last minute, it is Anna who has an idea. She points out to the monsters that they will eventually die if they stay in the real world as all humans do. But if they return to the pages of the novels from whence they came, they will live on forever as the legends they are. Berber pushes the red button to start his machine, and David and Anna escape from their cuffs. Rather than the two being sucked into the machine, Christina reappears as a Viking, grabs Berber, and they both disappear. Anna and David conclude that the machine turned the two into archetypes of a Viking and a mad scientist. Having had a little time to ponder Anna's idea, Dracula tells David to press the red button again, as the monsters have chosen to return to their own lands as the legends they are rather than die in the real world. Before the four are sucked back into the pages of their respective novels, Dracula tells Anna that she is wise "for someone who has not yet lived a single lifetime. But do not fear," he adds, "we will always be with you... in your nightmares."

Anna later shows up at David's video store, gives him a check for $6,200, and informs him that Berber's lab has been torn down. She also gives him a book, the first English language edition of Venus in Furs. David thanks her and admits that he saw the film in "1970, directed by Jess Franco, starring Klaus Kinski. Actually, there was an earlier version directed by Larry Buchanan, the guy who did Zontar: The Thing from Venus (1966). Actually, I think there's a '94 version but it's all in Dutch...," he drones on. Anna interrupts him with a kiss.

Cast

 Rhonda Griffin as Anna Quarrels
 Justin Lauer as David Raleigh
 Bill Moynihan as Winston Berber
 Kristin Norton as Miss Christina
 Jon Simanton as Wolfman
 Joe Smith as Mummy
 Thomas Wellington as Frankenstein's Monster
 Phil Fondacaro as Dracula
 J.W. Perra as Video Store Customer
 Andrea Harper as Stella, Video Store Clerk

Reception
Critical reception for The Creeps has been mixed. Fangoria wrote that the film is "moderately successful" and "one of things to The Creeps credit is that while the filmmakers do indulge in the 'minuscule monster' angle, the movie doesn't sink to a series of tasteless short jokes or repetitive and sophomoric humorless indignities aimed at the diminutive actors." HorrorTalk commented that "No matter how you look at it, The Creeps is a bad movie" but that "Regardless of the minefield of faults, in the right hands The Creeps can be an entertaining film. It certainly isn't the Monster Squad meets Time Bandits you may have envisioned, but the special effects required some effort to produce and corners were definitely not cut." A reviewer for the British Fantasy Society also praised the film and wrote that it was "light, fun and a good chuckle throughout."

Keith Phipps wrote for The A.V. Club, "There's something embarrassingly entertaining about a three-foot-high werewolf, but that and a genuinely strong performance by veteran little-person actor Phil Fondacaro as Dracula are pretty much the extent of The Creeps charms."  While he wrote that the film was not funny and not scary, he qualified it was "far from unwatchable, and if you really need a cheesy horror movie, especially one with tiny monsters, you could do a lot worse."

Steve Miller heavily criticized the film in his book 150 Movies You Should Die Before You See, as he felt that the film was homophobic and made fun of people with dwarfism.

References

External links
 

1997 films
1997 comedy films
1997 horror films
1997 LGBT-related films
1990s comedy horror films
American comedy horror films
1990s English-language films
Dracula films
Frankenstein films
Mummy films
American werewolf films
Films about books
Films directed by Charles Band
Films set in libraries
Full Moon Features films
Films about human sacrifice
Lesbian-related films
Mad scientist films
LGBT-related comedy horror films
1990s American films